Scopula napariata is a moth of the  family Geometridae. It is found in Brazil and Colombia.

Subspecies
Scopula napariata napariata (Brazil)
Scopula napariata acrates Prout, 1938 (Colombia)

References

Moths described in 1858
napariata
Moths of South America